Elaraby is an Egyptian surname. Notable people with the surname include:

 Nabil Elaraby (born 1935), Egyptian politician and diplomat 
 Rowan Elaraby (born 2000), Egyptian squash player

Arabic-language surnames